Proctor Knott (foaled 1886 in Tennessee) was an American Thoroughbred racehorse gelding. His sire was the Hall of Famer Luke Blackburn, and his dam Tallapaloosa.  He was bred by Belle Meade Stud and like his father, who had been named for the then-current governor of Kentucky, he was named for Governor J. Proctor Knott. He was owned during his racing career by George Scoogan and Sam Bryant.

Racing career
Trained by co-owner, Captain Samuel W. Bryant, Proctor Knott had a career racing record of 26 starts, 11 wins, 6 seconds and 4 thirds, earning $80,350. In 1888, as a juvenile, he won the Alexander Stakes at Churchill Downs in Louisville, Kentucky. Returning north, Proctor Knott won the Junior Champion Stakes for which he earned $20,935, the richest offered by Monmouth Park Racetrack. By far his most important win came in the inaugural running of Futurity Stakes at Sheepshead Bay Race Track. The winner's share of the purse was the enormous amount of $41,675 at a time when the 1888 Kentucky Derby winner earned $4,740 and the 1888 Belmont Stakes winner $3,440.

Proctor Knott is listed by Thoroughbred Heritage as American Champion Two-Year-Old Male Horse of 1888. During his three-year-old campaign, at Churchill Downs Proctor Knott finished second in the Kentucky Derby as the 1-2 favorite behind Spokane. Proctor Knott false started twice, ran off and almost unseated his rider, according to the official comments, then raced wide and lost in a contested finish. He also ran second in the Omnibus Stakes at Monmouth Park behind Longstreet, the 1891 American Horse of the Year and son of the great Longfellow. He ran second again in the Clark Handicap, where the finishers came in just as they had in the Kentucky Derby.

Racing at age three, Proctor Knott had limited success but did win the Sheridan Stakes at Washington Park Racetrack in Chicago. In that race he defeated Spokane, the horse he had run second to in the Kentucky Derby.

Proctor Knott vs. Salvator

Salvator, a member of the National Museum of Racing and Hall of Fame, never defeated Proctor Knott. In Salvator's first start, the Junior Champion Stakes at Monmouth Park Racetrack, Proctor Knott won while Salvator came in third.  Three weeks later, their rivalry was renewed in the Futurity, where Proctor Knott again won.  After this race, Proctor Knott was given time off, while Salvator continued to race and won four more stakes. Their next and final meeting was in the Omnibus Stakes.  While neither of them won, Proctor Knott placed ahead of Salvator.  Salvator never lost again in seven more races, while Proctor Knott won only two of his final nine races.

Legacy

Proctor Knott died on the morning of August 6, 1891.  The Proctor Knott Handicap was won in 1921 by Black Servant, a son of Black Toney.  The race was conducted at Churchill Downs between 1920 and 1921.

References

External links
 Proctor Knott's pedigree and record, plus etching

1886 racehorse births
1891 racehorse deaths
Racehorses bred in Tennessee
Racehorses trained in the United States
Thoroughbred family A22